(FF:U) is an anime television series based on Square Enix's popular Final Fantasy role-playing video game franchise. The TV series was produced by It incorporates both 2D animation and 3D graphics, and takes elements from the Final Fantasy games. It was licensed for North America and the United Kingdom by ADV Films were released on DVD. FF:U was directed by Mahiro Maeda of GONZO, produced by TV Tokyo's Keisuke Iwata, and Square Enix's Kensuke Tanaka. Square Enix game designer Akitoshi Kawazu served as base concept planning and was intended to be the director for the planned video game series.

Due to a combination of low ratings and the financial failure of Final Fantasy: The Spirits Within, the anime series's planned 52-episode run was cut to 25, leaving the story unfinished. The continuation of the story has been released in a variety of other media including printed and web novel series, manga, radio dramas, and video games.

Plot
FF:U follows the story of Ai and Yu Hayakawa, 12-year-old twins who travel into Wonderland, a mysterious parallel dimension, in search of their missing parents. Other main characters include Lisa Pacifist, a 22-year-old woman whom Ai and Yu encounter in the Subway as she becomes their protector while helping them search for their parents in Wonderland. The series is divided into two major sections, defined by the main method of transport the protagonists are utilizing. The first half of the series sees the group using the Ghost Train to reach a part of Wonderland, crossing paths with Kaze as he has no memory of his past save Makenshi, who aids the Lords of Gaudium who attack them. The group also encounters fragments of a destructive being named Omega, which is after the Ghost Train's power source to become whole. Meanwhile, the story from the antagonist's view is periodically revealed with Earl Tyrant's discussion with his lords. Earl is the embodiment of Chaos and is seeking the fragments of Omega to possess a power equal to the Unlimited, beings of immense power like Kaze and Makenshi who could destroy him.

The second half of the series sees the protagonists join up with the rebel faction, the Comodeen, and board the submarine, Jane, which is bound for Telos, the only place in Wonderland that has a natural deposit of the gravity-defying Flying Water. Both parties sought this substance: the Comodeen to power their airship Silvia to reach Earl's flying fortress Gaudium and the Earl's forces using the substance to contain Omega's power. The series climaxes when the Earl himself makes a move on the Comodeen, destroying Jane and capturing the protagonists in his true form: Chaos Tyrant. It was then that the Earl's right-hand man, Oscha, reveals that Ai and Yu were spawned from Chaos in the aftermath of Kaze and Makenshi's sending their adoptive parents to Wonderland. With only Omega's heart, Clear, remaining and fused with his Flying Water suit into a crystal, the Earl intended to absorb the Hayakawa twins as well to increase Chaos's power from their experiences. Luckily, Lou Lupus and Moogle come to their friends' aid as the Earl killed the former. Confronted with Chaos Tyrant, Kaze and Makenshi sacrifice themselves to destroy the Earl, thus ending his reign of terror over Wonderland while Lisa and the Hayakawa family were found by the Comodeen.

Characters

Production and release
FF:U was directed by Mahiro Maeda of GONZO and produced by TV Tokyo's Keisuke Iwata, and Square Enix's Kensuke Tanaka. Square Enix game designer Akitoshi Kawazu served as base concept planning. A series of video games were intended with Kawazu as director. Due to a combination of low ratings and the financial failure of Final Fantasy: The Spirits Within, the anime series's planned 52-episode run was cut to 25, leaving the story unfinished. FF:U aired on TV Tokyo's Network 6 on weekly on Tuesday 6:30PM starting on October 2, 2001. Japan released the series for home media via DVD and divided it into nine separate releases, known as "Phases". ADV Films picked up the series for North America and United Kingdom on May 1, 2003. The North American complete boxset re-arranges the series into five discs of five episodes each, titled "Phase 1" through "Phase 5." The European released the complete boxset retains the seven discs as released singularly. Both were released by A.D.V. Films. A promotional DVD titled Final Fantasy: Unlimited Prologue Phase.0 was released containing the history of Final Fantasy, the production history of FF:U and interviews with the cast. It was released on January 30, 2002.

Music
FF:U was composed by Nobuo Uematsu, Shirō Hamaguchi, and Akifumi Tada. The series has an opening theme and three ending themes. The opening theme for the series is "Over the FANTASY" (Composed by Nobuo Uematsu, Arranged by Takahiro Ando, Lyrics by Yuko Ebine) performed by Kana Ueda. The first theme is "VIVID" (Lyrics and Composition by Takashi Genouzono, Arrangements by Fairy Fore and Masao Akashi) performed by Fairy Fore and was used for episodes 1-13. For episodes 14-24 the ending theme was "Romancing Train" (Composition and arrangements by t-kimura, lyrics by motsu) performed by move. The third ending theme was "Over the FANTASY" and was used on the final episode of the series.

Avex mode released the singles for the opening and endings. The "VIVID" single was released on November 7, 2001. The "Over the FANTASY" single was released on December 5, 2001. The single for "Romance Train" was released on February 6, 2002. Two soundtracks were produced by Avex mode. The second titled  was released on April 17, 2002.

All music and arrangements were made by Shiro Hamaguchi unless where otherwise specified.

Related media

Printed
A novel titled,  was released on March 28, 2002, by Kadokawa Shoten. The novel was written by Sho Katigiri, illustrated by Kazuto Nakazawa, and supervised by Squaresoft. It explores a side story that is set in the time of the television series. A 96-page artbook titled  was published by Kadokawa Shoten and released on April 22, 2002. A book titled  was released on May 15, 2002 by DigiCube. The book contains a 32-page manga drawn by Hiroyuki Yamashita and a 120-page script written by Atsuhiro Tomioka. It covers the twins' return to their own world, the revelation of Lisa's past, and introduces a new villain under Gaudium: Soljashy. A serial web novel titled FF:U After Spiral was written by Sho Katigiri, supervised by Atsuhiro Tomioka, and was published on the official Japanese FF:U website. The series has a total of seven chapters and one spin-off chapter were released and take place after the events of FF:U After.

Audio
A serial audio drama titled  was available for those who subscribed to TV Tokyo's Anime-X service via mobile phones on i-mode's distribution service. A total of 10 episodes were released monthly beginning on January 15, 2002. It was conducted by Yoshitomo Yonetani with Kikuko Inoue returning as Fabula's voice actress. The series was compiled and released on September 30, 2002 in CD-ROM for Windows 95, 98, Me, 2000, XP, and iMac G3. Two drama CDs were released by Avex mode. The first drama CD titled  was given to customers for a limited time as a gift for those who purchased the DVD Boxset. It tells a story in the form of a flashback of the destruction of Kaze and Makenshi's worlds. A radio drama titled  was released on December 26, 2002 and deals with Comodeen's final attack on Gaudium and brings a conclusion to the conflict between Lisa and Soljashy.

Video games 
Two video games have been released. The first, titled FF:U with U, is an RPG video game adaptation for Japanese mobile phones on i-mode's distribution service developed by Index was released on August 20, 2002. The game contains the same plot as the anime. Points can be accumulated by playing through the game's scenarios and be used to purchase more characters. Ringtones based on the music of FF:U can also be purchased through the game as microtransactions. The second game, titled , is a visual novel and card game set in the FF:U universe. Published by Amada Printing, it was released May 16, 2003.  Unlimited Saga was in production around the same time as the anime and originally connected to the setting of the anime series, but these plans were shelved during production. Kawazu later said that many of the similarities were coincidental due to his work on both projects.

Reception 
The series was ranked 18 by popular vote for Top 20 Anime in Japan for November 2001.

Outside Japan, the series had received mixed reviews. Play magazine reviewer David Halverson was disappointed that the series was aimed at a younger audience, stating "When I think Final Fantasy, I envision majestic characters, heart-wrenching drama and exquisite art, none of which make the scene in FF Unlimited". Allen Divers of Anime News Network (ANN) ranked the series an overall score "B" stating, "Despite its somewhat formulaic plot, Final Fantasy is an ambitious series and manages to be visually engaging." Sandra Scholes of Active Anime praised the series stating, "It is interesting to see how well thought out this series has been. The characters have been created with care and consideration for the ones out there who have followed the Final Fantasy genre from the start." However Ken Hargon of ANN criticized the series for being unappealing and not living up to the Final Fantasy series nor any other anime. Carlos Ross of T.H.E.M. ranked the series three stars stating that "The style is firmly entrenched in Saturday morning, but at least it's better than FF Legend of the Crystals." Paul Gaudette of Mania gave the series a "D" stating "Although it has almost nothing to do with its namesake, Final Fantasy Unlimited was somewhat enjoyable in the beginning while falling into every cliché of a show written for a younger audience."

Notes

References

External links

Official page at GONZO (archived from the original)
Official fan site (archived from the original)

Final Fantasy: Unlimited at the Final Fantasy Compendium
Fan Translation of Final Fantasy: Unlimited continuations

2001 anime television series debuts
Action anime and manga
ADV Films
Anime television series based on video games
Fantasy anime and manga
Gonzo (company)
Unlimited
2002 Japanese television series endings
Television series about parallel universes
TV Tokyo original programming